HMS Actaeon was a 26-gun sixth-rate frigate of the Royal Navy.

Career
Actaeon was designed in 1827 by the School of Naval Architecture, and launched from Portsmouth Dockyard on 31 January 1831.  She was first commissioned in November 1830 under Captain Frederick William Grey for service in the Mediterranean.

On 5 November 1831 she rescued the crew of Ariel, which was wrecked near Brindisi, Kingdom of the Two Sicilies. Ariel was on a voyage from Trieste to Greenock, Renfrewshire.

After serving in the Mediterranean Actaeon served off South America from November 1834 under Captain Lord Edward Russell. She was assigned to the British Pacific Squadron, arriving in Valparaíso in July 1836. She was involved in the charting of the Acteon Group: a group of islands that Russell named after this vessel.  By 1838 she was back in Portsmouth under the command of Robert Russell, who sailed her back to South America in August that year.

On 23 July 1840, she ran aground at Buenos Aires, Argentina whilst on a voyage from that port to Monte Video, Uruguay.

West Africa Squadron

Actaeon returned to Plymouth in 1844, before departing under Captain George Mansel in December 1844 to join the West Africa Squadron.  Whilst serving on this post, she captured the slavers Astrea and Theresa on 9 September 1847.

Survey vessel
Actaeon was paid off at Portsmouth in 1848, but was recommissioned again in 1857 to serve as a survey vessel off "the coast of China and Tartary", under the command of Captain William Thornton Bate. On 7 July, Actaeon ran aground on a reef in the Gaspar Strait and was damaged. She was then present at the bombardment of Canton in 1857, during the Second Opium War, where Bate was shot and killed on 29 December. Robert Jenkins replaced Bate on 30 December, and then John Ward took command on 1 March 1858. Ward carried out surveys for further military operations in August 1859, before returning to Britain.  Actaeon was at Shanghai on the night of Sunday, 7 April 1861 for the British census. Actaeon Sound in the Queen Charlotte Strait region of British Columbia, Canada, was named for Actaeon in 1865, with many neighbouring features named in association with its crew and captain in the general area of Drury Inlet.

Actaeon was then out of commission at Portsmouth in 1866, becoming a hospital ship. She was hulked in 1870 and lent to the Cork Harbour Board, before being sold at Portsmouth in February 1889 for breaking up.

Citations and references 
Citations

References
 
 Lyon, David and Winfield, Rif, The Sail and Steam Navy List: All the Ships of the Royal Navy 1815-1889, pub Chatham, 2004,

External links
 
Actaeon at Ships of the Old Navy
Details of Actaeon's career

 

Ships built in Portsmouth
Hospital ships of the United Kingdom
1831 ships
Ships of the West Africa Squadron
Sixth-rate frigates of the Royal Navy
Maritime incidents in July 1840
Maritime incidents in July 1857